All the Love is the seventh studio album by American deathrock band Christian Death, released through Jungle Records in 1989. It is the first part of the two-part series All the Love and All the Hate, the next being All the Hate. The album was released on cassette, CD and vinyl. The vinyl release of the album was available on regular black vinyl, and limited edition pink marble vinyl. One single was released from the album, "We Fall Like Love", on seven-inch and twelve-inch vinyl.

Track listing 
All songs written by Valor Kand, except where noted

Appollyon
"Live Love Together" – 3:20
"We Fall Like Love" – 5:03
"Love Don't Let Me Down" – 8:48 (Nick Farr, Kand)
"Suivre la Trace de Quelqu'un" – 4:33 (Farr, Kand)

Birth
"Love is Like a (B)Itchin' in My Heart" – 4:46 (Farr, Kand)
"I'm Using You (For Love)" – 6:04
"Deviate Love" – 3:14
"Angel" – 4:45 (Jimi Hendrix)
"Woman to Mother Earth" – 4:36

References

External links 
 at Discogs

Christian Death albums
1989 albums